Knechsteden Abbey is a former Premonstratensian abbey in Dormagen in North Rhine-Westphalia, Germany, since the 1890s a house of the Spiritans. It was founded in 1130, and in 1138 building began on the church, which was created a basilica minor in 1974.

Monasteries in North Rhine-Westphalia
Premonstratensian monasteries in Germany
Roman Catholic churches in North Rhine-Westphalia
1130s establishments in the Holy Roman Empire
1130 establishments in Europe
Religious organizations established in the 1130s
Basilica churches in Germany
Christian monasteries established in the 12th century
Buildings and structures in Rhein-Kreis Neuss